The 2005 AFC Futsal Championship was held in Ho Chi Minh City, Vietnam from 22 May to 4 June 2005.

Venues

Draw

Preliminary round

Group A

Group B

Group C

Group D

Group E

Group F

Second placed teams

Plate competition

Second round

Group I

Group J

Group K

Group L

Knockout stage

Semi-finals

Final

Cup competition

Second round

Group G

Group H

Knockout stage

Semi-finals

Final

Awards 

 Most Valuable Player
 Kenichiro Kogure
 Top Scorer
 Vahid Shamsaei (23 goals)

Goalscorers
23 goals
  Vahid Shamsaei

21 goals
  Kenichiro Kogure

13 goals
  Taji Abdullayev

12 goals

  Hassan Huthut
  Panuwat Janta

11 goals

  Hayssam Atwi
  Khaled Takaji
  Abdulaziz Al-Kuwari

10 goals

  Abdul-Karim Ghazi
  Mahmoud Itani
  Nader Hajjar
  Lee Sang-keun

9 goals

  Mohammed Hassanain
  Lee Kyung-min

8 goals

  Emil Kenjisariev
  Hashem Al-Shurafa
  Hazem Hajjar
  Rashid Al-Dosari
  Anucha Munjarern
  Joe Nueangkord
  Yilham Ilmuradov

7 goals

  Viernes Ricardo Polnaya
  Mohammad Hashemzadeh
  Hossein Soltani
  Wameedh Shamil
  Kensuke Takahashi
  Ahmad Al-Asfour
  Khalid Gharib
  Prasert Innui
  Abdulla Buriev
  Nikolay Odushev

6 goals

  Wu Zhuoxi
  Yan Fei
  Zhang Jiong
  Andi Irawan
  Majid Raeisi
  Mohsen Zareei
  Nurjan Djetybaev
  Rafat Rabee
  Lertchai Issarasuwipakorn
  Pattaya Piemkum
  Bahodir Ahmedov

5 goals

  Zhang Xi
  Leung Chi Kui
  Sayan Karmadi
  Jaelani Ladjanibi
  Zaid Watheq
  Kenta Fujii
  Nawaf Al-Otaibi
  Rabih Abu Chaaya
  Ng Boon Leong
  Khurshed Makhmudov
  Agajan Resulov
  Aleksandr Korolev
  Anvar Mamedov
  Farruh Zakirov
  Lê Quốc Khương
  Nguyễn Tuấn Thành

4 goals

  Wang Xiaoyu
  Yang Du
  Chang Fu-hsiang
  Hsueh Ming-wen
  Vennard Hutabarat
  Zaman Majid
  Yuki Kanayama
  Takuya Suzumura
  Fawzi Al-Mass
  Faizul Abdul Gaffar
  Ahmed Abdalhadi
  Mustafa Yasin
  Alexander Borromeo
  Narongsak Khongkaew
  Furkat Kudratov
  Saidolimhon Sharafutdinov

3 goals

  Passang Tshering
  Li Jian
  Xiong Sui
  Chen Kun-shan
  Ho Kuo-chen
  So Sheung Kwai
  Wahyu Triyanto
  Mohammad Reza Heidarian
  Javad Maheri
  Yasir Hameed
  Raed Khalf
  Daniar Abdyraimov
  Andrey Pestryakov
  Hassan Hammoud
  Ibrahim Hammoud
  Serge Said
  Ho Wai Tong
  Leong Lap San
  Mohd Saiful Mohd Noor
  Anton del Rosario
  Mohsin Ali
  Cho Jae-suk
  Oh Su-taek
  Eradzh Nasikhov
  Shavkatbek Muhitdinov
  Ilhom Yusupdjanov

References

 Futsal Planet
 RSSSF

AFC Futsal Championship
F
Championship
International futsal competitions hosted by Vietnam
21st century in Ho Chi Minh City
Sport in Ho Chi Minh City